Florentina Ioana Mosora or Florentina Stan-Mosora (7 January 1940 in Cluj, Romania – 2 February 1996 in Liège, Belgium) was a Romanian and Belgian biophysicist. In her earlier years, before 1964, she was a film actress in the Romanian film industry.

Biography
Mosora initially had a career in acting and was noted for her role in Dragoste la zero grade ("Love at Zero Degrees", 1964). She also starred in Sub cupola albastră ("Under the Blue Arch", 1962), Post-restant ("Poste Restante", 1961), and Băieţii noştri ("Our Boys", 1959). She was a graduate of the University of Bucharest's Faculty of Physics. Later she moved to Belgium, where she worked on the use of stable isotopes in medicine. She was awarded the 1979-1981 Prix Agathon de Potter for outstanding research work in physics by the Agathon de Potter Foundation and the Belgian Royal Academy. In 1989 she was one of three scientists co-organizing a NATO workshop on Biomechanical Transport Processes. She died aged 56 in Liège.

Selected works 

Florentina Mosora, "Experimental Studies of Variations of the State," in

References

External links
 

Romanian film actresses
Romanian physicists
Romanian biologists
Actors from Cluj-Napoca
University of Bucharest alumni
Romanian women scientists
1940 births
1996 deaths
Women biophysicists
Belgian women scientists
Belgian women biologists
Belgian women physicists
Romanian emigrants to Belgium
20th-century Romanian actresses
20th-century women scientists
20th-century Belgian scientists
20th-century biologists
Scientists from Cluj-Napoca